Frederick William Chadwick (8 September 1913 – 18 September 1987) was an English professional footballer who played in the Football League for Newport County, Ipswich Town and Bristol Rovers as a centre forward.

Personal life 
Chadwick was married with five children. During the Second World War, he was held prisoner of war by the Japanese and worked on the Burma Railway.

Career statistics

References 

English footballers

Clapton Orient F.C. wartime guest players
English Football League players
British Army personnel of World War II
1913 births
1987 deaths
Footballers from Manchester
Association football forwards
Burma Railway prisoners
Manchester City F.C. players
Wolverhampton Wanderers F.C. players
Newport County A.F.C. players
Ipswich Town F.C. players
West Ham United F.C. players
Bristol Rovers F.C. players
Street F.C. players
Southend United F.C. wartime guest players
Norwich City F.C. wartime guest players
World War II prisoners of war held by Japan
British World War II prisoners of war